The 1968 UCLA Bruins football team was an American football team that represented the University of California, Los Angeles during the 1968 NCAA University Division football season.  In their fourth year under head coach Tommy Prothro, the Bruins compiled a 3–7 record (2–4 Pac-8) and finished in a tie for fifth place in the Pacific-8 Conference.

UCLA's offensive leaders in 1968 were quarterback Jim Nader with 1,008 passing yards, running back Greg Jones with 497 rushing yards, and Ron Copeland with 372 receiving yards.

In a rebuilding year, the Bruins opened with two home wins: a 63–7 defeat of Pittsburgh and a ten-point win over Washington State. The season ground to a halt at Syracuse, and with the season-ending injury of quarterback Billy Bolden, UCLA won only once more, over Stanford 20–17.

The Bruins gave #1 USC and Heisman Trophy winner O. J. Simpson a scare in a 28–16 loss; UCLA trailed 21–16 late in the fourth quarter and had the ball inside USC's 10-yard line, but USC recovered a fumble and then used almost all of the remaining time in driving for their insurance touchdown.

Schedule

Roster

References

UCLA
UCLA Bruins football seasons
UCLA Bruins football
UCLA Bruins football